Kendall Township is a township in Kearny County, Kansas, United States.  As of the 2000 census, its population was 157.

Geography
Kendall Township covers an area of 190.77 square miles (494.09 square kilometers); of this, 0.01 square miles (0.02 square kilometers) or 0 percent is water. Lakes in this township include Clear Lake.

Adjacent townships
 Hartland Township (north)
 Lakin Township (northeast)
 Southside Township (northeast)
 Ivanhoe Township, Finney County (east)
 Dudley Township, Haskell County (southeast)
 Sherman Township, Grant County (south)
 Big Bow Township, Stanton County (southwest)
 Lamont Township, Hamilton County (west)
 Kendall Township, Hamilton County (northwest)

Major highways
 K-25 (Kansas highway)

Airports and landing strips
 Eveleigh Farms Airport
 Morgan Farms Airport

References
 U.S. Board on Geographic Names (GNIS)
 United States Census Bureau cartographic boundary files

External links
 City-Data.com

Townships in Kearny County, Kansas
Townships in Kansas